GURPS Alpha Centauri is a sourcebook for GURPS Third Edition.

Contents
GURPS Alpha Centauri details the setting of the Sid Meier's Alpha Centauri computer game.

Publication history
Steve Jackson Games published GURPS Alpha Centauri, a sourcebook for the GURPS role-playing game set in the Alpha Centauri universe.

Reception

References

Alpha Centauri in fiction
Alpha Centauri
Role-playing games based on video games
Science fiction role-playing games
Role-playing game supplements introduced in 2002